Lakeside University College, Ghana (LUCG) (formerly, Madina Institute of Science and Technology(MIST)) is a private nonprofit university in Accra, Ghana. It was established by Madina Foundation for Science & Technology (MFST) in 2013.

Organisation 
The university has three schools:

School Of Engineering

 Civil Engineering (BSc) 
 Mechanical Engineering (BSc)
 Oil and Gas Engineering (BSc)

School Of Business and Technology

Business Administration
 Banking and Finance (BSc) 
 Marketing (BSc) 
 Accounting (BSc)
 Human Resource Management (BSc)

School of Arts 
 Arabic Language Education (BA)
 computer science (BA)

Affiliations 

 Kwame Nkrumah University of Science and Technology (KNUST)
 University for Development Studies
 Appiah-Menka University of Skills Training and Entrepreneurial Development

References 

Lakeside University College